Ada Choi Siu-fan (born 17 September 1973) is a Hong Kong actress best known for her work for TVB television, as an evil empress in the Chinese television series Empresses in the Palace (甄嬛傳), and to a lesser extent, for her film work.

Career
Choi was born in 1973 in Hong Kong to a Chaozhou family. Her parents divorced when she was five years old. She speaks Cantonese, Mandarin, Teochow and English. In 1989, at the persuasion of her family, Choi participated in a modeling contest held by TVB at age 15. Two years later, she was a contestant in the 1991 Miss Hong Kong beauty pageant. During the semi-finals she placed first with an overall score of 483. She eventually finished as the second runner-up during the finals. As a result, she signed a contract with TVB and starting taking on acting jobs. She won the TVB Anniversary Award for Best Actress for her performance in Secret of the Heart (1998). Along with Maggie Cheung Ho-yee, Kenix Kwok, Flora Chan and Jessica Hsuan, Choi is known as one of the Top 5 "Fa Dans" (term used for actresses with high popularity) of TVB from the mid-1990s to mid-2000s. In 2009, she starred in Rebellion as a triad gang leader who chain-smokes and curses, a different type of role for Ada. In recent years, she has participated in numerous variety and reality shows as a regular cast member including Up Idol (2015), Run for Time (2015), My Dearest Ladies (2019) and Viva La Romance (2020).

Personal life
On 12 January 2008, Choi married Chinese actor Max Zhang whom she had dated for more than four years. He was her co-star in a number of Zhouyi Media television productions including The Legend of Magic Mirror (2003) and Eight Charts (2005). They have two daughters, Zoe and Chloe, born in 2011 and 2013 respectively. In 2019, they announced on social media that they were expecting their third child.  They welcomed their son, Joey Zhang Le'er aka Yudan in November 2019.

Filmography and awards

Television

Film

References

External links
 Official Sina Blog of Ada Choi
 Ada Choi on Sina Twitter
 
 
 HK cinemagic entry

 

|-
! colspan="3" style="background: #DAA520;" | TVB Anniversary Awards

|-
! colspan="3" style="background: #DAA520;" | Ming Pao Anniversary Awards

|-
! colspan="3" style="background: #DAA520;" | Miss Hong Kong

1973 births
Living people
Hong Kong Protestants
Hong Kong expatriates in China
Hong Kong film actresses
Hong Kong people of Vietnamese descent
Hong Kong television actresses
TVB veteran actors
20th-century Hong Kong actresses
21st-century Hong Kong actresses